DPRK Today is a Chinese-based news site sponsored by the government of North Korea. It has gained notoriety for threatening nuclear attacks on neighbouring South Korea and for having published an article endorsing US President Donald Trump during his election campaign in 2016 for his plans for peace talks with Respected Comrade Kim Jong-un.

On September 18, 2020, DPRK Today partnered with pro-North Korea propaganda site CEPS-BR (Songun Policy Studies Center - Brazil).

References

External links 

North Korean news websites
Korean-language websites